Farrell is an unincorporated community and census-designated place in Coahoma County, Mississippi, United States. Per the 2020 census, the population was 200.

Farrell has a post office. Its zip code is 38630.

Climate
The climate in this area is characterized by hot, humid summers and generally mild to cool winters.  According to the Köppen Climate Classification system, Farrell has a humid subtropical climate, abbreviated "Cfa" on climate maps.

Demographics

2020 census

Note: the US Census treats Hispanic/Latino as an ethnic category. This table excludes Latinos from the racial categories and assigns them to a separate category. Hispanics/Latinos can be of any race.

References

Census-designated places in Coahoma County, Mississippi
Census-designated places in Mississippi